Katrina Elizabeth DiCamillo (born March 25, 1964) is an American children's fiction author. She has published over 25 novels, including Because of Winn-Dixie, The Tiger Rising, The Tale of Despereaux, The Miraculous Journey of Edward Tulane, The Magician's Elephant, the Mercy Watson series, and Flora & Ulysses. Her books have sold around 37 million copies. Four have been developed into films and two have been adapted into musical settings. Her works have won various awards; The Tale of Despereaux and Flora & Ulysses won the Newbery Medal, making DiCamillo one of six authors to have won two Newbery Medals.

Born in Philadelphia, DiCamillo moved to Clermont, Florida, as a child, where she grew up. She earned an English degree from the University of Florida, Gainesville, and spent several years working entry-level jobs in Clermont before moving to Minneapolis, Minnesota, in 1994. In Minnesota, DiCamillo worked in a book warehouse and attempted to get a book published. Her first book to be accepted for publication was Because of Winn-Dixie, which was critically and commercially successful. DiCamillo then left her job to become a full-time author.

From 2014 to 2015 DiCamillo was the American National Ambassador for Young People's Literature. She lives in Minneapolis and continues to write. Her most recent novel, The Beatryce Prophecy, was published in 2021.

Early life and education 
Katrina Elizabeth DiCamillo was born on March 25, 1964, in Philadelphia, Pennsylvania, to Betty Lee DiCamillo, a teacher, and Adolph Louis DiCamillo, an orthodontist. DiCamillo has an older brother and had pet dogs as a child. She had chronic pneumonia as a child and was often hospitalized. In hopes of helping her sickness, the family moved to the warmer climate of Clermont, Florida, when Kate was five. Her father remained in Philadelphia with his business, but visited on occasion. Although he originally planned to move with the family after selling his practice, this never happened. DiCamillo was an avid reader as a child and often visited the local library. She later credited her mother for sparking her love for books. DiCamillo also often turned to reading when she was particularly sick with pneumonia and unable to do much else. She wanted to be a veterinarian until she was around ten.

She was educated at public schools in the area beginning with Clermont Elementary, before entering Rollins College. DiCamillo left Rollins and worked for a time at Walt Disney World before briefly attending the University of Central Florida. She eventually entered the University of Florida, Gainesville, and graduated with a bachelor's degree in English in 1987.

Early career 
DiCamillo then worked various entry-level jobs in Clermont, including at Circus World, Walt Disney World, a campground and in a greenhouse. She said of her life during this time that she thought she was a talented writer and expected it to be quickly recognized so she "sat around for the next seven or eight years". DiCamillo moved to Minneapolis in 1994, following a close friend, and after several jobs was hired to work in The Bookman, a book warehouse and distributor, as a picker, eventually in the children's book section, a placement that she was initially disappointed over. While working in the department, DiCamillo discovered The Watsons Go to Birmingham – 1963, a children's novel she greatly admired.

She began writing regularly while working in the book warehouse, waking up at before her shifts on weekdays to write. After four years in Minnesota, DiCamillo met the author Louise Erdrich, who offered her encouragement. DiCamillo submitted her books to several publishers. She received in return 473 rejection letters. She was also encouraged by the author Jane Resh Thomas. By the turn of the 21st century, despite her efforts, DiCamillo had only several short stories aimed at adults that had been published in magazines.

Writing career and recognition 
DiCamillo had published 25 books as of 2018. As of 2021, almost 37 million copies of her books were in print. In 2019 she was described as "Minnesota's most successful writer" in Mpls St Paul Magazine. The success of her books was described in 2006 by a Candlewick Press representative as a "cornerstone" of the publisher's success.

DiCamillo's first book to be accepted for publication was Because of Winn-Dixie by Candlewick Press, a story about a girl who finds a stray dog and takes it home. A 1998 McKnight Fellowship grant allowed her to focus more on writing. She conceived the book's plot during the winter of her first year living in Minnesota, when she was missing her Florida home and upset about her apartment's no-dog policy. DiCamillo gave her draft to a Candlewick sales agent who was at a Christmas party held by The Bookman. The book was initially given to an editor who left the company on maternity leave and was lost in a pile of other manuscripts. It was rediscovered when the employee's office was cleaned out. She was offered and signed a contract. After a rewrite, the book was published in 2000. Flo Davis, the wife of a founder of the Winn-Dixie supermarket chain, sponsored DiCamillo to visit various schools in Florida and widen the book's reach. It was a quick commercial and critical success. Afterwards, DiCamillo left her job to focus on writing full-time. She told the Chicago Tribune in 2004 that she forced herself to write two pages every day, which took her on average from thirty minutes to an hour. In 2017, DiCamillo estimated that she spent about 12–15 hours a week writing and 35 to 40 reading, mainly adult fiction. She often traveled to talk about her writing. During the COVID-19 pandemic, DiCamillo reported that she wrote every morning for 100 days.

Because of Winn-Dixie success marked the beginning of DiCamillo's writing career. It won the 2000 Josette Frank Award and a Newbery Honor. Her second book, The Tiger Rising, was published the following year. It was also well received by critics, who noted stylistic differences between it and Because of Winn-Dixie.  DiCamillo won the Newbery Medal in 2004 for her third work The Tale of Despereaux. She wrote the book upon the request of the child of one of her friends for a story with "an unlikely hero". DiCamillo said she was shocked by the news of the Newbery. DiCamillo said that her 2006 work The Miraculous Journey of Edward Tulane, which is about a china rabbit, was very easy to write.

The Mercy Watson series, which features a pig as its main character, began with Mercy Watson Goes for a Ride (2006) and ended with Mercy Watson: Something Wonky This Way Comes (2009). DiCamillo's 2010 novel Bink & Gollie, co-written with Alison McGhee and illustrated by Tony Fucile won the 2011 Theodor Seuss Geisel Medal. Her 2013 novel Flora & Ulysses was partially inspired by an injured squirrel she saw. It won the Newbery Medal in 2014, making her one of six writers to win two Newberys since the award was created in 1920.

In 2014 DiCamillo was named the fourth National Ambassador for Young People's Literature, a post she held from January 2014 to December 2015. Upon taking that role, she utilized the theme "Stories Connect Us". In both the summers of 2015 and 2016 DiCamillo led the Collaborative Summer Library Program's summer reading campaign as the summer reading champion.

Her 2016 book Raymie Nightingale, about three young girls competing in a competition who end as friends, did not feel complete, and two years later DiCamillo wrote a sequel, Louisiana's Way Home. In 2019 she published Beverly, Right Here, completing a trilogy. In The New York Times the author Kimberly Brubaker Bradley wrote that Beverly, Right Here "may be her [DiCamillo's] finest [novel] yet". In 2019 she received the Regina Medal in recognition of her writing. DiCamillo's 2019 picture book La La La uses just one word: "la". The governor of Minnesota, Tim Walz, named March 29, 2020, Kate DiCamillo Day. DiCamillo's most recent novel to be published, The Beatryce Prophecy, was begun in 2009, rediscovered in 2018 and published in September 2021.

Awards 
DiCamillo has received several awards for her books.

List of screen adaptations 
DiCamillo's books have been adapted into films and theatrical productions. Because of Winn-Dixie became a 2005 film by the same name. The Tale of Despereaux was developed into a 2008 film. Netflix began producing a film based on The Magician's Elephant in December 2020. Walt Disney Pictures released the film Flora & Ulysses on February 19, 2021, as a streaming video. The film The Tiger Rising was released in January 2022.

DiCamillo helped write the Because of Winn-Dixie screenplay and did some early consulting on The Tale of Despereaux, but was comparatively less involved. She has stated that she enjoyed both adaptations. She has a cameo in Flora & Ulysses.

In 2017 the Minnesota Opera announced that it was going to adapt The Miraculous Journey of Edward Tulane into an opera. The Magician's Elephant was adapted into a musical that was premiered in Stratford-upon-Avon by the Royal Shakespeare Company in October 2021. The Minnesota Opera canceled its scheduled opening and had not rescheduled it as of September 2021 but the Royal Society Shakespeare Company had scheduled a re-opening for October 14.

Theatrical feature films 
Because of Winn-Dixie - February 18, 2005
The Tale of Despereaux - December 19, 2008
Flora & Ulysses - February 19, 2021
The Tiger Rising - January 21, 2022
The Magician's Elephant - March 17, 2023

Analysis 
DiCamillo's style is often similar to children's literature from the Victorian or Edwardian eras. Homesickness and hope are frequent themes. Many of the books follow someone who is alone and has to survive on their own, undergoing suffering and loneliness, commonly the absence or loss of parents. The author Julie Schumacher said that "a sense of abandonment [...] pervades everything she [DiCamillo] has written." Other themes in DiCamillo's novels include love, salvation, emotional change, and "senseless cruelty", according to the New York Times. According to the Journal of the American Academy of Child and Adolescent Psychiatry, DiCamillo's works often begin with young protagonists who are "puzzled, wanting, and waiting" but conclude that they must handle matters on their own.

A New York Times article noted that she has written stories in many different genres. She told the National Endowment for the Arts that her books were "the same story, over and over in many ways" with the same themes repeating. DiCamillo has said that she doesn't know how to "develop a character" but she discovers them "and follow[s] their story." DiCamillo's fiction is influenced by her experiences growing up; for instance, many of her realistic fiction novels take place in north and central Florida and include dialogue common to the Southern United States. She told the Orlando Sentinel that she tries to leave room for the reader to read between the lines, saying that she has tried to emulate E. B. White: "He's using the same words we're all using. It must be that stripped-away quality, his heart is resting more on each word, and that's what I'm always trying to do." Her novels often include "distinct scenes that are lightly connected".

According to DiCamillo, The Miraculous Journey of Edward Tulane wrote itself, while many of her other works go through eight to nine drafts. She usually only writes one book at a time. However, she told The Horn Book Magazine in 2015 that she "juggled" various works, for instance writing a draft of a more serious novel and then switching to a shorter, less serious work. She has said that when writing books for children she tries to be direct and "not to condescend to them". In a 2018 article in Time, DiCamillo argued that children's books should be "a little bit sad". She told another interviewer that "the kid in me has never gone away" and when she writes for children rather than adults the main thing she changes is to be more hopeful. Many of her books have animals as the main character, something DiCamillo has described as ironic, because as a child she avoided such books.

In 2020 the author Ann Patchett published an essay in The New York Times describing reading DiCamillo's work as an adult and recommending that others read them too, describing her work as a whole as "sui generis, each one extraordinary".

List of works

Novels

Chapter books
 Bink & Gollie series (Candlewick Press), text by DiCamillo and Alison McGhee, illus. Tony Fucile
 Bink & Gollie (2010)
 Bink & Gollie: Two for One (2012)
 Bink & Gollie: Best Friends Forever (2013)
 Mercy Watson series (Candlewick Press), text by DiCamillo, illus. Chris Van Dusen
Mercy Watson to the Rescue (2005)
 Mercy Watson Goes for a Ride (2006)
 Mercy Watson Fights Crime (2006)
 Mercy Watson: Princess in Disguise (2007)
 Mercy Watson Thinks Like a Pig (2008)
 Mercy Watson: Something Wonky This Way Comes (2009)
 A Very Mercy Christmas (2022)
Tales from Deckawoo Drive series, text by DiCamillo, illus. Chris Van Dusen
 Leroy Ninker Saddles Up: Tales from Deckawoo Drive, Volume One (2014)
 Francine Poulet Meets the Ghost Raccoon: Tales from Deckawoo Drive, Volume Two (2015)
 Where Are You Going, Baby Lincoln?: Tales from Deckawoo Drive, Volume Three (2016)
 Eugenia Lincoln and the Unexpected Package: Tales from Deckawoo Drive, Volume Four (2017)

Picture books

Short stories

 "Your Question for Author Here", text by DiCamillo and Jon Scieszka, Guys Read: Funny Business (HarperCollins, 2010)
 "The Third Floor Bedroom", in Chris Van Allsburg, et al., The Chronicles of Harris Burdick: Fourteen Amazing Authors Tell the Tales (Houghton Mifflin Harcourt, 2011)

References

Bibliography

External links 

 
 
 Kate DiCamillo papers at University of Minnesota Libraries
 Profile of Kate DiCamillo by Andrea Tompa, one of her editors

1964 births
American children's writers
American writers of Italian descent
Newbery Honor winners
Newbery Medal winners
Novelists from Florida
Writers from Philadelphia
University of Florida alumni
Living people
People from Clermont, Florida
Writers from Minneapolis
20th-century American novelists
21st-century American novelists
20th-century American women writers
21st-century American women writers
American women children's writers
American women novelists
Novelists from Pennsylvania
Novelists from Minnesota
Women science fiction and fantasy writers